Yachthouse Residence Club is a complex of twin skyscrapers in the coastal city of Balneário Camboriú, Santa Catarina, southern Brazil. At 281 metres (922 feet) and 81 floors, the two buildings are the tallest in Brazil and the second-tallest in South America (second only to Gran Torre Santiago in Chile) since their completion in 2020, when they reached their maximum height, surpassing Infinity Coast, located in the same city. However, construction continued until mid-2022.

Construction

The outrigger technique was employed.

Extreme sports
Owing to its height, Yachthouse has become, even before its completion, a preferred site for extreme sports. In November 2017, basejumpers from all across Brazil reunited to jump from a  height. In January 2021, wingsuit enthusiasts used the building for their practice.

See also
 Infinity Coast
 Millennium Palace
 List of tallest buildings in Brazil
 List of tallest buildings in South America

References

Balneário Camboriú
Buildings and structures in Santa Catarina (state)
Residential skyscrapers in Brazil
Buildings and structures completed in 2022
Residential skyscrapers